Araiya is a genus of South American anyphaenid sac spiders first described by M. J. Ramírez in 2003. it contains only two species.

References

Anyphaenidae
Araneomorphae genera
Spiders of South America